Arsene Lupin is a 1916 British silent crime film directed by George Loane Tucker and starring Gerald Ames, Manora Thew and Kenelm Foss. It features the popular French master criminal Arsene Lupin, and is the first instance of the character in English-language media.

Cast
 Gerald Ames as Arsene Lupin 
 Manora Thew as Savia 
 Kenelm Foss as Inspector Guerchard 
 Douglas Munro as Gournay-Martin 
 Marga Rubia Levy
 Philip Hewland

References

Bibliography
 Low, Rachael. The History of British Film, Volume III: 1914-1918. Routledge, 1997.

External links

1916 films
1916 crime films
British crime films
British silent feature films
1910s English-language films
Films directed by George Loane Tucker
Films set in France
British black-and-white films
British films based on plays
Films based on adaptations
Films based on works by Francis de Croisset
Arsène Lupin films
1910s British films
Silent adventure films